The Beartooth Butte Formation is a geologic formation in Wyoming. It preserves fossils dating back to the Devonian period.

Description 
The formation contains a basal limestone conglomerate overlain by evenly bedded red or gray limestones (more accurately, limy mudstones) and calcareous shales. Most collections are from the talus slope. Stable oxygen and isotope data (Poulson in Fiorillo, 2000) indicate that the Beartooth Butte Formation was deposited in an estuarine environment, with the Cottonwood Canyon section being slightly less saline than the type section.

Fossil content 
The following fossils have been reported from the formation:

Fish

 Allocryptaspis ellipticus
 A. flabelliformis
 Anarthraspis chamberlini
 A. montanus
 Bryantolepis brachycephalus
 B. cristatus
 Bryantolepis major
 B. obscurus
 Bulbocanthus rugosus
 Cardipeltis bryanti
 C. richardoni
 Cosmaspis transversa
 Gosslingia americana
 Lampraspis tuberculata
 Machaeracanthus minor
 Onchus penetrans
 O. peracutus
 Protaspis brevispina
 P. mcgrewi
 Psilophyton wyomingense
 Uranolophus wyomingensis
 Aethaspis sp.
 Cephalaspis sp.
 Simblaspis sp.

Insects
 Acanthoscorpio mucronatus
 Branchioscorpio richardsoni
 Hydroscorpius denisoni
 Praearcturus sp.

Flora
 Psilophyton wyomingense
 Drepanophycus devonicus
 Euphyllophytina sp.
 Gosslingia sp.

Invertebrates
 Brachiopoda indet.

See also 
 List of fossiliferous stratigraphic units in Wyoming
 Paleontology in Wyoming

References

Bibliography 
 
 

Geologic formations of Wyoming
Devonian geology of Wyoming
Emsian Stage
Lochkovian Stage
Pragian Stage
Limestone formations
Mudstone formations
Sandstone formations
Shale formations
Shallow marine deposits
Devonian southern paleotemperate deposits
Devonian southern paleotropical deposits
Paleontology in Wyoming